The Scottish Rite Cathedral in Harrisburg, Pennsylvania is a Masonic building located at 2701 N. Third St. in Harrisburg.

The "Theatre at the Scottish Rite Cathedral" was utilized in the "Harrisburg Arts Alive!" program, but in 2021 all events have been "on Hold Due to COVID-19 Virus".

References

External links
Scottish Rite Cathedral, at wikimapia
Valley of Harrisburg

Harrisburg
Churches in Harrisburg, Pennsylvania